Galeolaria caespitosa is a worm of the family Serpulidae, casually referred to as Sydney coral when found in dense aggregations. It is an Australian inter-tidal tube worm which lives within a hard tube like shell, which prevents desiccation at high tide. Black feathery gills emerge when it is underwater for it to filter feed on plankton.

References

Serpulidae
Animals described in 1818